Tarlac may refer to:
Places in the Philippines
 Tarlac Province
 Tarlac City
 Tarlac River

People
 Dragan Tarlać, basketball player